Robert Louis Ladehoff (born February 19, 1932) was eighth bishop of the Episcopal Diocese of Oregon. He was consecrated on November 30, 1985.

References

1932 births
Living people
American Episcopalians
Place of birth missing (living people)
Episcopal Church in Oregon
Episcopal bishops of Oregon